Miss X may refer to:
 Miss X (comics), a fictional, comic-book character in the DC Comics universe
 Miss X (decedent), an unidentified young woman whose body was found in 1967 in Bear, Delaware
 Miss X and Miss Z, characters from the animated television series Johnny Test
 Miss XV, a Mexican television series
 Miss X, the one time recording alias of Joyce Blair
 Miss X, an alias of Iori Yagami in SNK's The King of Fighters video game series

See also
 Mister X (disambiguation)
 Mrs. X (character)
 Madame X (disambiguation)
 Lady X (disambiguation)
 X (disambiguation)